Randall A. Lipps is the chairman, president and chief executive officer of Omnicell, Inc., a provider of systems and software solutions to increase patient safety and operational efficiency in health care facilities. He is also the director at large of the American Society of Health-System Pharmacists Foundation's Board of Directors  and is a member of the Board of Directors for Radisphere, a radiology provider.

Early life 
Lipps has served as chairman of the board and director of Omnicell, Inc. since he founded the company in September 1992. He holds both a B.S. in economics and a B.B.A. from Southern Methodist University.

References

External links 
 Lydia Dishman, "How Technology Thwarts the Real-Life Nurse Jackie", Fast Company
 "Streamlining Hospitals: Omnicell CEO Randy Lipps (Part 1)", Sramana Mitra's One Million by One Million Blog
 Douglas E. Caldwell, "He built firm by selling efficiency", ''Silicon Valley Business Journal'

American technology chief executives
Living people
Southern Methodist University alumni
Year of birth missing (living people)